Ivar Peter Bagger Knudsen (1 April 1861 – 23 March 1920) was a Danish engineer.

Early life
Knudsen was born to Jens Elsbert Knudsen (1826–1901), a manager of a grocery firm, and Julie Vilhelmine Rønberg (1828–88).
He trained to be a mechanic in Aarhus and worked in this profession until 1882 when he went to Copenhagen to study at the Technical University of Denmark. After finishing his studies in 1887 he was involved in the design of the fortifications of Copenhagen. He then worked as a mechanical engineer for the electric utility of Copenhagen.

Engineering career
In 1895 he joined B&W as chief mechanical engineer. He was promoted to Director of the engine department in 1897 where he started a comprehensive modernization. Knudsen realised the potential of the diesel engine as ship propulsion and traveled to Germany to meet Rudolf Diesel who was testing the new engines at MAN AG in Augsburg. Consequently B&W obtained the patent rights on the Diesel engine for Denmark. The following years saw numerous tests and improvements, eventually resulting in an efficient and reliable machine. In 1908 Knudsen became the head of both the machine factory in Christianshavn and the shipyard in Refshaleøen.

The first voyage in February 1912, with Andersen and Knudsen on board, was from Copenhagen to Bangkok via London and Antwerp. The ship was received with great interest and many people visited the Selandia including the First Lord of the Admiralty, Winston Churchill, and other high ranking naval officers.

The Fionia was met with similar interest in Germany during Kiel Week, where visitors included German Emperor Wilhelm II and Albert Ballin, director of the Hamburg America Line.

Knudsen resigned from the yard's daily management in April 1919, joining the company's board as an advisor.

Death
Ivar Knudsen died "mysteriously" from food poisoning while on a trip to India on 23 March 1920.

Awards
Order of the Dannebrog (1900)
Medal of Merit (1912)

See also

References

External links
 "Knudsen, Ivar", Salmonsens Konversationsleksikon

1861 births
1920 deaths
Danish engineers
Knights of the Order of the Dannebrog
Burials at Hellerup Cemetery